Erivélton Martins (born 10 July 1954), known as Erivélto, is a Brazilian former footballer who played as a midfielder. He competed in the men's tournament at the 1976 Summer Olympics.

References

External links
 

1954 births
Living people
Footballers from Rio de Janeiro (city)
Brazilian footballers
Association football midfielders
Brazil international footballers
Olympic footballers of Brazil
Footballers at the 1976 Summer Olympics
Pan American Games gold medalists for Brazil
Medalists at the 1975 Pan American Games
Pan American Games medalists in football
Footballers at the 1975 Pan American Games